Yael German (born 4 August 1947) is an Israeli politician and diplomat who served as a member of the Knesset for Yesh Atid and the Blue and White alliance between 2013 and 2020. She was Minister of Health between 2013 and 2014 and mayor of Herzliya between 1998 and 2013. German was appointed as the Israeli Ambassador to France in 2021, but resigned in 2022.

Biography
German was born in Haifa to Jewish parents from Romania and Poland. She studied at the Tel Aviv University, gaining a bachelor's degree in history. Married and with two children, she has lived in Herzliya since 1979.

In 1993, she became a member of the Herzliya Municipal Council for Meretz. In 1998, she was elected mayor of the city, and in 2003, she was elected for a second term with 56% of the vote. Whilst mayor she fought the Cellular Companies Forum that wanted to increase the number of cellular antennas in the city. Eventually, her fight succeeded when the Knesset passed the Cellular Antenna Law.

Prior to the 2013 Knesset elections, she joined the new Yesh Atid party, and was elected to the Knesset. When a new government was formed, she was appointed Minister of Health. She was placed third on the party's list for the 2015 elections, and was re-elected as the party won 11 seats. She was re-elected again in the April 2019, September 2019 and March 2020 elections, in which Yesh Atid ran as part of the Blue and White alliance. However, she resigned from the Knesset shortly after the 2020 elections due to health concerns. Her seat was taken by Idan Roll.

German was appointned as the ambassador of Israel to France by Foreign Minister Yair Lapid in August 2021. She resigned in December 2022 in protest against what she described as "extreme positions" of the newly sworn in coalition government headed by Benjamin Netanyahu.

References

External links

1947 births
Living people
Reichman University alumni
Israeli Ashkenazi Jews
Israeli people of Romanian-Jewish descent
Women members of the Knesset
Mayors of places in Israel
People from Herzliya
Members of the 19th Knesset (2013–2015)
Members of the 20th Knesset (2015–2019)
Members of the 21st Knesset (2019)
Members of the 22nd Knesset (2019–2020)
Meretz politicians
Ministers of Health of Israel
People from Haifa
Tel Aviv University alumni
Women mayors of places in Israel
Yesh Atid politicians
21st-century Israeli women politicians
Women government ministers of Israel